Prefab is prefabrication, the practice of assembling at a manufacturing site, and transporting to the construction site.

Prefab may also refer to:

 Prefab building, a prefabricated building
 Prefabricated home, specialist dwelling types of prefabricated building

See also
 Prefabs in the UK
 Prefab Sprout, a band